The Hasanlu Lovers are a pair of human remains found at the Teppe Hasanlu archaeological site, located in the Naqadeh in the West Azerbaijan Province of Iran. Around 800 BCE, the city of Hasanlu, located in north-western Iran, was destroyed by an unknown invader. Inhabitants were slain and left where they fell. In 1973, the lovers were discovered by a team of archaeologists from the University of Pennsylvania led by Robert H. Dyson.

The two human skeletons were found together in a bin during excavations, seemingly embracing at the time of death, with no other objects except a stone slab under the head of one skeleton. They died together around 800 BCE, during the last destruction of the Hasanlu. Approximately 246 skeletons were found at the site altogether. How the lovers died and ended up in the bin is still under speculation but both skeletons lack evidence of injury near the time of death and possibly died of asphyxiation. They were exhibited at the Penn Museum from 1974 until the mid-1980s.

The right skeleton, referred to as HAS 73-5-799 (SK 335), is lying on its back and the left skeleton, referred to as HAS 73-5-800 (SK 336), is lying on its left side facing SK 335. When excavated, the skeletons were tested to determine various characteristics. Dental evidence suggest SK 335 was a young adult, possibly 19–22 years of age. Researchers identified the skeleton as male largely based on the pelvis. The skeleton had no apparent evidence of disease or healed lifetime injuries. Skeleton SK 336 appeared to have been healthy in life; the skeleton had no apparent evidence of healed lifetimes injuries, and was estimated to have been aged to about 30–35 years. Sex determination of the left skeleton was less definitive.  Evidence suggests SK 336 was also male after being originally identified as female. The skeletons have been a subject of debate since they were first excavated.

Archaeological record of Hasanlu 

Hasanlu is an ancient Near Eastern site located in the Qadar River valley, on the southern shore of Lake Urmia in northwest Iran. The city of Hasanlu was occupied consistently from the sixth millennium BCE to around 800 BCE, when the site was invaded and destroyed by fire. In 1934–1936 Hasanlu was commercially dug by Sir Aurel Stein, a British archaeologist. Then, in 1956, the Hasanlu Project was launched by the sponsorship of the University Museum of Pennsylvania, the Metropolitan Museum of Art, and the Archaeological Service of Iran. Following the launch of the Hasanlu Project, a team of archaeologists from Penn Museum led by Director Robert H. Dyson excavated the site from 1957 to 1974. This team completed nine excavation campaigns, and the excavation of the site ended more than 40 years ago (as of in 2022).

Excavation of the site revealed burnt remains of huge mudbrick walls, thick layers of ash, skeletons, vessels, and more. Excavation exposed extensive destruction – evidence of the city’s invasion and arson. Archaeologists explain that the nature of the destruction resulted in the city being frozen in time, preserving buildings, artefacts, and skeletal remains. Approximately 246 skeletons, of a variety of ages and genders were found.  The bodies were left where they were killed in the streets and in buildings. Some victims were found in groups, with head lacerations, and dismembered limbs which suggested mass executions had taken place. Among the 246 skeletons found, two of them were the remains of the Hasanlu Lovers.

Who attacked Hasanlu is still unknown, but the general academic consensus is that the Iranian Empire were the invaders, but the Assyrian Empire was also very prominent in the region. There is no indication from the skeletons themselves or from the artefacts exactly who the invaders were. The city of Hasanlu itself is considered protohistoric: they didn’t have any writing around the site, unlike other regions around them. Because of this, archaeologists do not know how they would have identified themselves, or who they were, or the language they would have spoken.

Rediscovery and excavation 

The skeletal remains of the Hasanlu Lovers were found together in a plaster-lined brick bin with no other objects except a stone slab under the head of one skeleton. The excavation took place in 1973, directed by Robert H. Dyson, Jr.  Dr. Selinsky stated that the lovers perished together during the invasion of the site, around 800 BCE, during the last destruction of the Hasanlu, but did not have any lethal wounds. Archaeologist Oscar Muscarella suggests that the hole in the right skeleton's skull is not due to an injury, but the result of a blow created by a workman’s pickaxe. When discovered, the two skeletons were facing and embracing each other. The skeleton on the left is lying on their left side, reaching with their right hand towards the skeleton on the right.

There is no definitive explanation as to how the two skeletons ended up in the binonly assumptions. One assumption is that, “they must have crawled into this bin, which was probably covered at the time, and escaped detection.” Since cause of death wasn’t due to injury, archaeologists have concluded that the probable cause of death was asphyxiation, when debris fell from the burning building, and sealed them in.

Scientific analysis 
Anthropologists Page Selinsky and Janet Monge go into extensive detail about the DNA testing of the Hasanlu lovers and how the DNA testing compares to the skeletal assessment of their biological sex.

The lovers were first sampled for specific isotopes to see if there were any differences in the skeletal series and the diets that they consumed. What the isotopic testing revealed was that the diets of the individuals were quite varied, but they were not patterned in any particular way. Isotopic signatures indicate that the diets of the residents of Hasanlu were varied, including wheat, barley, sheep and goats. Isotopic signatures coming from oxygen revealed the lovers' settlement patterns; these oxygen isotopic signatures revealed that the lovers, and the other Hasanlu people, were all born and raised in the Hasanlu area.

It was concluded by Selinsky and Monge that both individuals were male. They came to this conclusion when comparing both the DNA analysis and skeletal assessment. Dr Selinsky stated that the pelvis was the single best criterion for estimating the sex of the skeletons as there are distinctive features between a female and a male pelvis.

The skeleton on the right (referred to as SK 335) is lying on its back. The front portion of his pelvis was lost but when examining his sciatic notch, it was evident he was a male due to the very narrow gap which is a distinctive feature of the male pelvis. As such, researchers identified the skeleton as male largely based on the pelvis. The skeleton had no apparent evidence of disease or healed lifetime injuries.

For the left skeleton (SK 336), lying on its left side facing SK 335, the sex estimation was less clear, but overall research suggests a male: the cranium is distinctively male, while the pelvis is more mixed in its morphology. At the time of excavation, this skeleton was originally identified as female. This was because his sciatic notch was quite wide, a characteristic of a female pelvis, but the front portion of his pelvis which was retrieved from the site, had an acute angle in the front and was less pulled out than a female’s, which suggested the skeleton was a male. The individual appeared to have been healthy in life, and the skeleton had no apparent evidence of healed lifetime injuries. The sex of the lovers was confirmed from a bone sample for an ancient DNA analysis. The genetic determination of the Hasanlu lovers was male.

The age of the two skeletons was also determined. Dental evidence suggests that the right skeleton was a young adult or subadult, estimated to be aged 19–22 years old, as he has third molars, and his wisdom teeth recently grew. His skull was less developed, which was attributable to the young age of the individual. The left skeleton was estimated to be an older adult 30–35 years old; his skull had fully developed, and the cranium was distinctively male.

Controversy 
Some researchers argue sensationalism about the Hasanlu Lovers, and other potential examples of non-heteronormative behaviours in the past are problematic. The two skeletons received their sobriquet 'Hasanlu Lovers' due to the intimate position they were found in. Before the skeletons were subjected to DNA analysis one skeleton was thought to be male and the other female. Muscarella, an archaeologist who was heavily invested in the discoveries made at Hasanlu, states, "I knew at first sight who was the female," in reference to the two skeletons. However, the team from the University of Pennsylvania, assessed that the right skeleton was likely male due to its morphology. The left skeleton had less clear osteological indicators, but was later identified to be male through DNA analysis. Limitations of osteological sex assessments as noted by one author is that there are many times when the biological sex can not be certain, and that these tests do not reveal anything about the culturally-constructed gender.

Reasons for expecting the skeletons to be heteronormative couple, as Killgrove and Geller explain, is because we are encultured to see this representation. Projecting contemporary assumptions about sex, gender, and sexuality onto the past can be problematic, states Geller. Finally, the true relationship between the two skeletons is unknown and remains up to speculation.

See also 
 Embracing Skeletons of Alepotrypa
 Lovers of Valdaro
 Lovers of Cluj-Napoca
 Lovers of Modena
 Lovers of Teruel

References

Further reading 
 Brahic, C. (2018, September 15). The Horror of Hasanlu. NewScientist, 239(3195), 36–39. doi:https://doi.org/10.1016/S0262-4079(18)31662-2
 Dyson, R. H., & Muscarella, O. W. (1989). Constructing the Chronology and Historical Implications of Hasanlu IV. Journal of the Bristish Institute of Persian Studies, 27(1), 1–27. doi:https://doi.org/10.1080/05786967.1989.11834359
 Ellsworth, A. (2010, September 10). Penn Museum. Retrieved from Fun Friday Image Of The Week – The Lovers : Penn Museum Blog | Fun Friday Image of the Week – The Lovers
 House of History. (2020, August 21). The Oldest Kiss in History (800 BCE). Retrieved from The Oldest Kiss in History (800 BCE)
 Karasavvas, T. (2020, July 2). The Eternal Kiss of the Hasanlu Lovers Throws Up Questions of Ancient Love: Romance, Bromance or Something More Familial? Retrieved from Ancient Origins: Reconstructing The Story Of Humanity's Past: https://www.ancient-origins.net/artifacts-other-artifacts/eternal-kiss-hasanlu-lovers-throws-questions-ancient-love-romance-bromance-021587
 Killgrove, K. (2017, April 9). That Skeleton Gay? The Problem With Projecting Modern Ideas Onto the Past. Retrieved from Forbes: Is That Skeleton Gay? The Problem With Projecting Modern Ideas Onto The Past
 Medvedskaya, I. (1988). Who Destroyed Hasanlu IV? Journal of the British Institute of Persian Studies, 26(1), 1–15. doi:https://doi.org/10.1080/05786967.1988.11834344
 Muscarella, O. W. (2006). The Excavation of Hasanlu: An Archaeological Evaluation. Bulletin of the American Schools of Oriental Research, 342, 69–94. The Excavation of Hasanlu: An Archaeological Evaluation
 Muscarella, O. W. (2013). The Excavation of Hasanlu: An Archaeological Evaluation. In O. W. Muscarella, Archaeology, Atifacts and Antiquities of the Ancient Near East (pp. 305–349). The Netherlands: Brill. doi:https://doi.org/10.1163/9789004236691_011
 Muscarella, O. W., & Koehl, R. B. (2013). The Hasanlu Lovers. In O. W. Muscarella, & R. B. Koehl, Amilla (pp. 345–350). Institute for Aegean Prehistory Press.
 Paoletti, G. (2017, December 20). Hasanlu Lovers: The Story Behind A 2800-Year-Old-Embrace. Retrieved from ATI: Hasanlu Lovers: The Story Behind A 2800-Year-Old-Embrace
 Robert H. Dyson, J. (1965). Problems of Protohistoric Iran as Seen from Hasanlu. Journal of Near Eastern Studies, 24(3), 193—217.
 Robert H. Dyson, J. (1989). Rediscovering Hasanlu. Expedition, 31(2–3), 3–11. Retrieved from 
 Selinsky, P. (2017). Lovers, Friends, or Strangers? Penn Museum, Expedition Magazine, 59(2), 46.
 Selinsky, P., & Monge, J. (2017, October 18). Expedition – "Hasanlu Lovers". Penn Museum. Retrieved from Expedition – "Hasanlu Lovers"
 Urbanus, J. (2015, January/February). The Price of Plunder. Retrieved from Archaeology : The Price of Plunder – Archaeology Magazine

1972 archaeological discoveries
Archaeology of death
Archaeology of Iran
Burial monuments and structures
Couples
Death in Iran
Human remains (archaeological)
Skeletons
Teppe Hasanlu
University of Pennsylvania Museum of Archaeology and Anthropology
West Azerbaijan Province